A quantum clock is a type of atomic clock with laser cooled single ions confined together in an electromagnetic ion trap. Developed in 2010 by physicists as the U.S. National Institute of Standards and Technology, the clock was 37 times more precise than the then-existing international standard.  The quantum logic clock is based on an aluminium spectroscopy ion with a logic atom.

Both the aluminum-based quantum clock and the mercury-based optical atomic clock track time by the ion vibration at an optical frequency using a UV laser, that is 100,000 times higher than the microwave frequencies used in NIST-F1 and other similar time standards around the world. Quantum clocks like this are able to be far more precise than microwave standards.

Accuracy 

The NIST team are not able to measure clock ticks per second because the definition of a second is based on the standard NIST-F1, which cannot measure a machine more precise than itself. NIST have attributed the clock's accuracy to the fact that it is insensitive to background magnetic and electric fields, and unaffected by temperature.

In March 2008, physicists at NIST described an experimental quantum logic clock based on individual ions of beryllium and aluminum. This clock was compared to NIST's mercury ion clock. These were the most accurate clocks that had been constructed, with neither clock gaining nor losing time at a rate that would exceed a second in over a billion years.

In February 2010, NIST physicists described a second, enhanced version of the quantum logic clock based on individual ions of magnesium and aluminium.

In terms of standard deviation, the quantum logic clock deviates one second every 3.68 billion years, while the then current international standard NIST-F1 Caesium fountain atomic clock uncertainty was about 3.1 × 10−16 expected to neither gain nor lose a second in more than 100 million years.

Quantum time dilation

In a 2020 paper scientists illustrated that and how quantum clocks could experience a possibly experimentally testable superposition of proper times via time dilation of the theory of relativity by which time passes slower for one object in relation to another object when the former moves at a higher velocity. In "quantum time dilation" one of the two clocks moves in a superposition of two localized momentum wave packets, resulting in a change to the classical time dilation.

More accurate experimental clocks

The accuracy of quantum clocks was briefly superseded by optical lattice clocks based on strontium-87 and ytterbium-171 until 2019. An experimental optical lattice clock was described in a 2014 Nature paper.
In 2015 JILA evaluated the absolute frequency uncertainty of their latest strontium-87 429 THz 
At this frequency uncertainty, this JILA optical lattice optical clock is expected to neither gain nor lose a second in more than 15 billion years.

On February 16 2022 the journal Nature published that Jun Ye was able to use a Strontium-87 quantum lattice clock to observe gravitational redshift down to the 1 mm scale. (Previous measurements had been limited to a minimum of 30 cm.)

See also 
 Atomic clock

References

Atomic clocks
Philosophy of physics
Philosophy of time
Quantum information science
Quantum measurement
Space science